Mimodromius is a genus of beetles in the family Carabidae, containing the following species:

 Mimodromius altus Liebke, 1951 
 Mimodromius aptinoides (Brulle, 1837) 
 Mimodromius bicolor (Brulle, 1837) 
 Mimodromius bolivianus Mateu, 1955 
 Mimodromius bosqui Mateu, 1955 
 Mimodromius chilensis (Solier, 1849) 
 Mimodromius chopardi Mateu, 1955 
 Mimodromius cruciger (Chaudoir, 1876) 
 Mimodromius cyanipennis (Brulle, 1834) 
 Mimodromius descendens Mateu, 1955 
 Mimodromius elegantulus Mateu, 1964 
 Mimodromius equatorianus Mateu, 1970 
 Mimodromius fleissi Mateu, 1959 
 Mimodromius frigidus Germain, 1894 
 Mimodromius gracilis Chaudoir, 1876 
 Mimodromius hassenteufeli Mateu, 1959 
 Mimodromius insperatus Mateu, 1986 
 Mimodromius leleupi Mateu, 1972 
 Mimodromius lepidus (Brulle, 1834) 
 Mimodromius lividus Mateu, 1955 
 Mimodromius lojanus Liebke, 1935 
 Mimodromius martinezi (Mateu, 1959) 
 Mimodromius metallicus Mateu, 1955 
 Mimodromius monrosi Mateu, 1955 
 Mimodromius negrei Mateu, 1960 
 Mimodromius nigroeburneus Mateu, 1955 
 Mimodromius obscuripennis Chaudoir, 1876 
 Mimodromius onorei Mateu, 1993 
 Mimodromius parallelus Chaudoir, 1876 
 Mimodromius peruvianus Mateu, 1955 
 Mimodromius phaeoxanthus Chaudoir, 1876 
 Mimodromius philippii Reed, 1874 
 Mimodromius poggii Mateu, 1985 
 Mimodromius proseni Mateu, 1955 
 Mimodromius puncticeps Liebke, 1935 
 Mimodromius rugosus Mateu, 1955 
 Mimodromius solieri Csiki, 1932 
 Mimodromius straneoi Mateu, 1960 
 Mimodromius trivittis (Chaudoir, 1876) 
 Mimodromius veyrauchi Mateu, 1970 
 Mimodromius wagneri Liebke, 1935 
 Mimodromius zischkai Mateu, 1955

References

Lebiinae